Radical Democratic Party (RDP), was a political party in India which existed at the time of the Second World War. Also known as the Radical Communist Party. RDP evolved out of the League of Radical Congressmen, which had been founded in 1939 by former Communist International leader M.N. Roy. Roy founded Radical Democratic Party in 1940 with the purpose of engaging India in the war to support the Allies. RDP also worked for Indian independence. RDP was against the industrial strike that took place at the time.

During the period 1944–1948 the general secretary of RDP was V. M. Tarkunde.

The trade union wing of the Royists was the Indian Federation of Labour.

RDP was dissolved in 1948, to give place to the Radical Humanist movement.

External links
 Article on M.N. Roy at FreeIndia.org
 Article on V.M. Tarkunde
 Bio-data on Jagdish Prasad Mathur, BJP MP who belonged to RDP

Further reading
 Leftist Politics in India; M. N. Roy and the Radical Democratic Party by Dipti Kumar Roy, 1989 Minerva, 
  Report: last battles of freedom, Radical Democratic Party, 1945 Calcutta

Defunct communist parties in India
Political parties established in 1940
Radical parties
Political parties disestablished in 1948
1940 establishments in India
1948 disestablishments in India